The Wedell-Williams Aviation & Cypress Sawmill Museum – Patterson is a branch of the Louisiana State Museum located at 118 Cotten Road, Patterson, Louisiana, United States.  It covers the aviation and industrial history of Louisiana

Wedell-Williams Aviation Collection
This collection is named after Jimmie Wedell and Harry Williams from the interwar period.  It has a number of early racing airplanes and memorabilia.

Patterson Cypress Sawmill Collection
The industrial history of the Patterson lumberyards is illustrated by the items in this collection.

References

External links
Louisiana State Museum - Patterson

Aerospace museums in Louisiana
Museums in St. Mary Parish, Louisiana
Industry museums in Louisiana
Atchafalaya National Heritage Area
Louisiana State Museum
Forestry museums in the United States